A coil tap is a wiring feature found on some electrical transformers, inductors and coil pickups, all of which are sets of wire coils. The coil tap(s) are points in a wire coil where a conductive patch has been exposed (usually on a loop of wire that extends out of the main coil body).

When the coil taps are disconnected, the coil operates as normal (see transformer). When a coil tap is connected to one end of the coil (or the end disconnected and reconnected to the tap), the section of coil between the tap and its connected end is bypassed - effectively reducing the number of turns in the coil.

Uses

Musical Instruments
Single coil magnetic pickups found in electric guitars can be coil tapped to reduce the number of windings around the magnet.  A tapped single coil pickup typically contains three wires: a ground, an output, and a tapped output - with the two outputs generally wired to a switch on the guitar.  The guitarist can then choose between the loud, punchy, midrange-heavy sound of the entire coil, or 'tap' into the inner coil for a quieter, yet bright vintage tone with a more clear and detailed high end.

Many guitarists mistakenly refer to humbucker coil splits as a coil taps, however, this is incorrect: a coil split is a humbucker with one coil removed from the wiring, leaving a single coil.  Because of the ubiquity of this error, and the rareness of coil taps in general, it is difficult to find tappable single coil pickups.  However, pickup manufacturer Seymour Duncan offers tapped versions of many of their Telecaster and Stratocaster pickups on their website at a slightly greater cost than a standard version.

A Few Tapped Coil Pickup Manufacturers: 
Seymour Duncan - Coil tapped models denoted by T following name, for example, the SSL-7 "Quarter Pound" pickup with a coil tap option would be listed as SSL-7T "Quarter Pound" pickup.
Häussel Pickups - Häussel  makes a pickup based on Schecter's F500T pickup.
Zhangbucker Pickups - Offers tapped versions of their pickups.
 DS Pickups (Argentina) Offers tapped versions of some of their pickups.

Transformers 
In a transformer, coil taps are often used on both the input and output coils.
On the input coils, the taps are usually connected by switches to compensate for differing supply potential - for example, between 110 V and 230 V for American and European mains electricity.
On the output coils, taps are used to provide a range of output potentials. Prototyping transformers are often supplied in cases which have spring-loaded contact taps - one common and several taps (for example, Common; 3 V; 5 V; 10 V.)

Inductors 
Coil taps on inductors are quite rare, but are sometimes used for band switching in tuning circuits.

Coil Pickups
Coil pickups used with measuring instruments often feature coil taps to compensate for band rejection or equipment input impedance.

Telephone tapping 
Coil taps can be used as a rudimentary method for recording telephone conversations. See Telephone tapping.

References

Electromagnetic components